In algorithmic game theory, a branch of both computer science and economics, a demand oracle is a function that, given a price-vector, returns the demand of an agent. It is used by many algorithms related to pricing and optimization in online market. It is usually contrasted with a value oracle, which is a function that, given a set of items, returns the value assigned to them by an agent.

Demand 
The demand of an agent is the bundle of items that the agent most prefers, given some fixed prices of the items. As an example, consider a market with three objects and one agent, with the following values and prices.

Suppose the agent's utility function is additive (= the value of a bundle is the sum of values of the items in the bundle), and quasilinear (= the utility of a bundle is the value of the bundle minus its price). Then, the demand of the agent, given the prices, is the set {Banana, Cherry}, which gives a utility of (4+6)-(3+1) = 6. Every other set gives the agent a smaller utility. For example, the empty set gives utility 0, while the set of all items gives utility (2+4+6)-(5+3+1)=3.

Oracle 
With additive valuations, the demand function is easy to compute - there is no need for an "oracle". However, in general, agents may have combinatorial valuations. This means that, for each combination of items, they may have a different value, which is not necessarily a sum of their values for the individual items. Describing such a function on m items might require up to 2m numbers - a number for each subset. This may be infeasible when m is large. Therefore, many algorithms for markets use two kinds of oracles:

 A value oracle can answer value queries: given a bundle, it returns its value.
 A demand oracle can answer demand queries: given a price-vector, it returns a bundle that maximizes the quasilinear utility (value minus price).

Applications 
Some examples of algorithms using demand oracles are:

 Welfare maximization: there are n agents and m items. Each agent is represented by a value-oracle and a demand-oracle. It is required to allocate the items among the agents such that the sum of values is maximized. In general the problem is NP-hard, but approximations are known for special cases, such as submodular valuations (this is called the "submodular welfare problem"). Some algorithms use only a value oracle; other algorithms use also a demand oracle.
Envy-free pricing: there are n agents and m items. Each agent is represented by a value-oracle and a demand-oracle. It is required to find a price-vector and an allocation of the items, such that no agent is envious, and subject to that, the seller's revenue is maximized.
Market equilibrium computation.
Learning strong-substitutes demand.

See also 

 Oracle machine
 Demand curve
 Robertson-Webb query model - a similar query model in the domain of cake-cutting.

References 

Computational economics